The 1966 British Grand Prix was a Formula One motor race held at Brands Hatch on 16 July 1966. It was race 4 of 9 in both the 1966 World Championship of Drivers and the 1966 International Cup for Formula One Manufacturers. It was the 21st British Grand Prix and the second to be held at Brands Hatch. It was held over 80 laps of the four kilometre circuit for a race distance of 341 kilometres.

The race, the first of the new three-litre engine regulation era where starters reached 20 cars, was won for the third time by Australian driver Jack Brabham in his Brabham BT19, his second win in succession after winning the French Grand Prix two weeks earlier. New Zealand driver Denny Hulme finished second in his Brabham BT20, a first 1–2 win for the Brabham team. The pair finished a lap ahead of third placed British driver Graham Hill in his BRM P261. Ferrari did not participate in this Grand Prix weekend to honour a metalworkers strike in Italy.

Brabham's win ended a streak of 4 consecutive wins by Jim Clark at the British Grand Prix.

Brabham's win put him ten points clear in the championship chase over Austrian Cooper racer Jochen Rindt with Hulme and Ferrari's Lorenzo Bandini a point further back.

Race summary
Brabham and Hill duelled at the start, until rain storms arrived on the circuit. Whilst Brabham maintained his lead, Rindt who had changed to rain tyres was catching him rapidly, whilst John Surtees in the Cooper was in third, well clear of the rest of the field. Hill and Jim Clark then battled for second and third until Clark pitted and then Hulme took over second place. As the rain dried, Rindt fell back. Surtees retired with mechanical problems, leaving Clark in fourth. Brabham duly led home teammate Hulme, Hill, Clark, Rindt and Bruce McLaren.

Classification

Qualifying

Race

Championship standings after the race 

Drivers' Championship standings

Constructors' Championship standings

 Notes: Only the top five positions are included for both sets of standings.

References

British Grand Prix
British Grand Prix
Grand Prix
British Grand Prix